Sepulchrave, Earl of Groan is a fictional character in the 1946 novel Titus Groan, the first volume in the Gormenghast series of fantasy novels by English writer Mervyn Peake.

Character 
Sepulchrave is the 76th Earl of Groan and Lord of Gormenghast, the gigantic, isolate citadel-state which forms the setting/otherworld for the Titus Groan novels of Mervyn Peake.

He is father to Titus Groan and Fuchsia Groan, brother to Cora and Clarice Groan, and estranged husband to the Countess Gertrude.

He is afflicted by an intense melancholia that leaves him psychologically paralyzed for most of the novel. The movements of his every waking hour are dictated by the "immemorial rites set down in the books of the lore of Groan",  a canon of meaningless, endlessly cross-referenced and encoded ritual that forms the foundation of the decaying Gormenghast society.

This lore is interpreted for Sepulchrave by his Master of Ritual, Sourdust, who meets him at a lavish breakfast every morning; a breakfast that is never eaten and which is left to waste. Sepulchrave has no appetite and is moved by no emotion other than weary and unrelenting depression. However, his frozen heart is mildly stirred at the outset of Titus Groan by the news of the birth of his son.

The only relief afforded to Sepulchrave from his misery is literature. He is variously described as having a powerful but listless intellect. His imbecile sisters Cora and Clarice remark; "He's very clever but he learns it all from books." His sanctuary is the Library, a building in Gormenghast to which he retires every night after his ceremonial duties have been discharged and in which he remains reading until the small hours of the morning. The Library is located in the shadow of the Tower of Flints, the heart of Gormenghast and a Dark Tower that comes to dominate Sepulchrave's mind. His melancholia infects the very air of the library; ‘imparting its illness on either side.’ He reads of every subject but he is drawn particularly to poetry. Fragments of the fictional poets that he reads allow Peake to exercise his considerable poetic gifts within the novel.

And his appearance, as described in Titus Groan:
Sepulchrave's appearance and age are ambiguous. He is described almost entirely in terms of his emotional state. However, we learn that he possesses a fine aquiline nose and seems to be a tall, slender, elegant and quixotic figure, with a pale complexion and large expressive eyes. He dresses in the robes and vestments prescribed by the rituals of Gormenghast; they may be rags or silk. He sometimes wears the iron crown of Groan, with its four arrowhead points from which depend slim linked chains.

After his library burns down, Sepulchrave goes mad, believing himself to be the 'Death Owl'; this affects his appearance: his nose becomes "more forceful", his eyes become round and devoid of all emotion, his mouth "might as well not be there".

Story

Birth of Titus
On the day of Titus's birth, Sepulchrave is engaged in another round of empty ritual. However, after the birth, he meets with Doctor Prunesquallor in an upper corridor outside the room of his wife, Gertrude. During the course of the conversation, he displays some interest in the condition of his child and inquires whether the doctor "... notices anything strange, unusual about his (Titus's) face." The Doctor replies that "Professionally speaking. I should say the face was irregular." Sepulchrave is distressed: "Tell me the truth; have you ever delivered a more hideous child?!"

The Fire 
The destruction of Sepulchrave's library is entirely masterminded by Steerpike, the ruthlessly Machiavellian scullion, to further his personal interests, although he pretends that he is doing it in order to advance Sepulchrave's idiot sisters, Cora and Clarice, who are monomaniacs obsessed with power. Steerpike engineers a daring rescue from the flames of several characters including Sepulchrave, Titus, Gertrude, Fuchsia, Flay, Doctor Alfred Prunesquallor and Irma Prunesquallor. The Master of Ritual Sourdust, however, perishes of asphyxiation and is consumed.

The Holocaust drives Sepulchrave insane; he at first seeks solace by playing with pine-cones with Fuchsia, pretending that they are his lost books, before undergoing a psychological transformation into the character of the Death Owl: He howls and hoots, perches on the mantelpiece, eats mice and has to be frequently sedated by Doctor Prunesquallor. At the dinner table, in the chapter entitled 'The Reveries', Sepulchrave's mind is filled with the thoughts of the owls "whose child I am".

Death of Sepulchrave 
After Mr. Flay duels with and eventually overcomes his nemesis Abiatha Swelter, Sepulchrave appears, ghost-like and claims the gigantic corpse in the name of the owls to whom he intends to offer it. He drags the body to the Tower of Flints, where it and he are torn apart and devoured. He thus characterizes his suicide as a form of dark catharsis or transformation. The impression is not one of freedom, however, but rather his absorption into the shadow-life of the castle. His death remains a mystery to all but Flay until he relates the manner of it to Fuchsia and Titus during his exile.

Fictional earls
Literary characters introduced in 1946
Gormenghast
Characters in British novels of the 20th century